Hydrometra gracilenta, the lesser water-measurer, is a species of aquatic bugs in the family Hydrometridae.

Description 
Its specific name is from the Latin word for "slender."

Habitat 
This species lives in ponds in Northern Europe (including Great Britain and Ireland) and Italy. It is on the United Kingdom Biodiversity Action Plan (UKBAP) list, preferring well-vegetated ditches flooded, or surface wet fen (marsh) with dense vegetation.

Behaviour
It is diurnal and eats other insects, including Chironomidae (non-biting midges). The female lays her eggs in May or June; they develop into nymphs and then become adults by July. The name "water measurer" refers to the insects' habit of walking on the surface of ditches and ponds, apparently pacing the distances between points. Hydrophobic hairs on its legs allow it to walk on the surface of the water.

References

External links
 Distribution map in Ireland
 

Hydrometroidea
Hemiptera of Europe
Taxa named by Géza Horváth
Insects described in 1899